This is a list of Portuguese films released in 2022.

Films

References

2022
Portugal